Olive Sagapolu (born February 16, 1997) is an American football defensive tackle for the Pittsburgh Maulers of the United States Football League (USFL). He played college football at Wisconsin.

Professional career

Green Bay Packers
On July 26, 2019, Sagapolu signed with the Green Bay Packers of the National Football League (NFL). He was waived on August 31.

Detroit Lions
On December 17, 2019, Sagapolu was signed to the Detroit Lions practice squad. On December 30, 2019, Sagapolu was signed to a reserve/future contract. On August 27, 2020, Sagapolu was waived by the Lions. He was re-signed four days later but waived again on September 5.

Atlanta Falcons
On May 17, 2021, Sagapolu was signed by the Atlanta Falcons. On August 24, the Falcons released Sagapolu.

Pittsburgh Maulers
Sagapolu was selected in the 24th round of the 2022 USFL Draft by the Pittsburgh Maulers

Personal life
Olive's uncle Domata Peko played in the NFL and went to Michigan State. Olive's other uncle Tupe Peko played in the NFL as well as the Arena Football League. Olive enjoys swimming in the ocean, playing the ukulele and singing. He is engaged to fiancée Carly Pierce, whom he met during his senior year at the University of Wisconsin-Madison.

References

Further reading

1997 births
Living people
Players of American football from American Samoa
People from Pago Pago
Wisconsin Badgers football players
American football defensive tackles
Green Bay Packers players
Detroit Lions players
Atlanta Falcons players
Pittsburgh Maulers (2022) players